Agios Isidoros is a small town, locally referred to as "the Village" on the island of Rhodes. It is known for wine production.

References 

Populated places in Rhodes